Bình Chánh is an rural district (huyện) in the southwest of Ho Chi Minh City in Vietnam. High urbanization rate has made Bình Chánh become one of a high population growth districts in the city. As of 2018, the district had a population of 680,000. It covers an area of 253 km2. The district capital lies at Tân Túc.

Bình Chánh district borders District 8, Bình Tân district, Hóc Môn District and Nhà Bè District.

References

External links
UBND Huyện Bình Chánh Thành phố Hồ Chí Minh—official website

Districts of Ho Chi Minh City